Charles Stanmore (16 June 1924 – 25 January 2012) was an Australian fencer. He competed in four events at the 1952 Summer Olympics.

References

External links
 

1924 births
2012 deaths
Australian male fencers
Olympic fencers of Australia
Fencers at the 1952 Summer Olympics
Commonwealth Games medallists in fencing
Commonwealth Games gold medallists for Australia
Fencers at the 1950 British Empire Games
People from the Hunter Region
Sportsmen from New South Wales
Medallists at the 1950 British Empire Games